Kirk Farmer (born August 27, 1979) is a former American football quarterback. He played college football at Missouri. He was signed by the St. Louis Rams as an Undrafted free agent in 2003. He also played for the Kansas City Chiefs and the Frankfurt Galaxy.

Early years
Farmer attended Jefferson City High School along with future All-American, and Missouri teammate, Justin Smith. He passed for 770 yards, ran for 673 and accounted for 31 touchdowns in 1997 as Jefferson City won the state 5A championship while also a regular on Jefferson City's basketball team that was ranked as high as No. 4 in the state.  Farmer also earned all state honors in golf recording a final round of 68 at the MSHAA Boy's State Championship.  The round was the third lowest in MSHAA State Championship history at the time.

College career
Farmer showed great potential during his time with the Missouri, but injuries continually slowed him down. His best season came in 2001, where recording the then 7th most yards of total offense in Tigers history with 1,976 yards despite starting only 9 games. Unfortunately, injuries once again reared their ugly head in his senior season, allowing Brad Smith to record his breakout.

Professional career

St. Louis Rams
Farmer was not selected in the 2003 NFL Draft, but was signed by the St. Louis Rams as an Undrafted free agent. Initial reports revealed he was impressing the Rams with his arm, even leading then head coach Mike Martz to say Farmer has the strongest arm of any quarterback he’s ever worked with.

Kansas City Chiefs
Farmer was picked up the following year by the Kansas City Chiefs on January 27, 2004.

Frankfurt Galaxy
He was later allocated to the Frankfurt Galaxy of NFL Europe where he spent the rest of the year.  In 2015 Farmer and his family were inducted into the Missouri Sports Hall of Fame.

Business
After football, Farmer joined his family's company, Farmer Companies, where they own and operate construction material related businesses.

References

External links
 
 Just SportsStats
 College stats

1979 births
Living people
American football quarterbacks
Missouri Tigers football players
Frankfurt Galaxy players
Sportspeople from Jefferson City, Missouri
Players of American football from Missouri